Faraday & Company is an American crime drama television series that was part of the NBC Mystery Movie. It lasted for only four episodes, which were rotated with Banacek, The Snoop Sisters, and Tenafly on Wednesday nights from 8:30 p.m. to 10:00 p.m. during the 1973–74 season. NBC rebroadcast the episodes on Tuesday nights from April through August 1974.

Plot
Private investigator Frank Faraday (Dan Dailey), who had been falsely accused of murdering his partner, escapes from a South American prison after 28 years of confinement. Returning to a Los Angeles that has greatly changed during his absence, Frank discovers that he has a full-grown son named Steve (James Naughton), who is also a private investigator. Steve was the son of Frank's girlfriend, Lou Carson (Geraldine Brooks), who had taken over Frank's detective agency. Father and son now work together to solve mysteries, while Frank tries to adjust to modern life. Sharon Gless plays their secretary, Holly Barrett.

Episodes

References

 

1973 American television series debuts
1974 American television series endings
1970s American crime drama television series
American detective television series
English-language television shows
NBC Mystery Movie
NBC original programming
Television shows set in Los Angeles
Television series by Talent Associates